This is a List of Madhya Pradesh List A cricket records, with each list containing the top five performances in the category.

Currently active players are bolded.

Team records

Highest innings totals

Lowest innings totals

Largest Margin of Runs Victory

Batting records

Highest individual scores

Bowling records

Best innings bowling

Hat-Tricks

Notes

All lists are referenced to CricketArchive.

See also

 Madhya Pradesh cricket team
 List of Madhya Pradesh first-class cricket records

Cricket in Madhya Pradesh